Glenn Alexandria Wood (July 18, 1925 – January 18, 2019) was an American NASCAR driver from Stuart, Virginia.

Early life 
He and brother Leonard Wood co-founded the legendary Wood Brothers Racing team in 1953, and won four races over an eleven-year racing career. In 1998, he was named one of NASCAR's 50 Greatest Drivers. In 1996, Wood was inducted into the Virginia Sports Hall of Fame; he was also inducted into the NASCAR Hall of Fame in 2012.

Wood died on January 18, 2019, after a battle with illnesses.

Motorsports career results

NASCAR
(key) (Bold – Pole position awarded by qualifying time. Italics – Pole position earned by points standings or practice time. * – Most laps led.)

Grand National Series

Daytona 500

References

External links
 

1925 births
International Motorsports Hall of Fame inductees
2019 deaths
NASCAR drivers
NASCAR team owners
People from Stuart, Virginia
Racing drivers from Virginia
NASCAR Hall of Fame inductees